The Birthday Honours, in some Commonwealth realms, mark the reigning British monarch's official birthday by granting various individuals appointment into national or dynastic orders or the award of decorations and medals. The honours are presented by the monarch or a viceregal representative. The Birthday Honours are one of two annual honours lists, along with the New Year Honours. All royal honours are published in the relevant gazette.

History
Honours have been awarded with few exceptions on the sovereign's birthday since at least 1860, during the reign of Queen Victoria. There was no Birthday Honours list issued in 1876, which brought "a good deal of disappointment" and even rebuke for the Ministry of Defence. A lengthy article in the Broad Arrow newspaper forgave the Queen and criticised Gathorne Hardy for neglecting to award worthy soldiers with the Order of the Bath: "With the War Minister all general patronage of this description rests, and if Mr. Hardy has not seen fit to mark the occasion in the usual way, he alone can be blamed or praised for having neglected to follow in the beaten track of his predecessors." At the same time, it was noted that the Queen appeared to have issued her own honours by appointing the Prince of Wales and the Duke of Connaught to be her personal aides-de-camp and the ailing King George of Hanover to be a general in the British Army.

The birthday of her successor, King Edward VII (r. 1901–1910), fell on 9 November 1901. From 1959, the monarch's official birthday in the United Kingdom was moved to a Saturday in early June. Other Commonwealth realms celebrate the official birthday of the monarch on different dates (generally late May or early June); honours are awarded accordingly.

The Birthday Honours were not issued on occasions when they coincided with Jubilee Honours in 1887 and 1897 and Coronation Honours in 1911, 1937, and 1953.

The British 2020 Honours were postponed until the autumn because of the COVID-19 pandemic.

See also
 Honours Committee
 Order of Australia
 Prime Minister's Resignation Honours
 2021 Birthday Honours
 2022 Birthday Honours

References

External links
 Honours lists – List and links of birthday honours lists as published in the London Gazette (since 1940)
 Honours lists – List and links of birthday honours lists as published in the London Gazette (1885–1939)

 
1908 establishments in the United Kingdom
Awards established in 1908